Henry Horsey may refer to:

 Henry R. Horsey (1924–2016), American judge
 Henry Herbert Horsey (1871–1942), Canadian athlete, businessman and politician
 Henry Horsey (architect), Canadian architect who designed the original Renfrew County Courthouse